The governor of California is the head of government of the U.S. state of California. The governor is the commander-in-chief of the California National Guard and the California State Guard.

Established in the Constitution of California, the governor's responsibilities also include making the annual State of the State address to the California State Legislature, submitting the budget, and ensuring that state laws are enforced. The position was created in 1849, the year before California became a state.

The current governor of California is Democrat Gavin Newsom, who was inaugurated on January 7, 2019.

Gubernatorial elections, oath, and term of office

Qualifications
A candidate for governor must be a U.S. citizen and a registered voter within the state, must not have been convicted of a felony involving bribery, embezzlement, or extortion, and must not have served two terms since November 6, 1990.

Election and oath of office
Governors are elected by popular ballot and serve terms of four years, with a limit of two terms, if served after November 6, 1990. Governors take the following oath:

I (Governor) do solemnly swear that I will support and defend the Constitution of the United States and the Constitution of the State of California against all enemies foreign and domestic, that I will bear true faith and allegiance to the Constitution of the United States and the Constitution of the State of California, that I take this obligation freely without any mental reservation or purpose of evasion and that I will well and faithfully discharge the duties upon which I am about to enter.Governors take office on the first Monday after January 1 after their election.

Gubernatorial removal 

Two methods exist to remove a governor.

Impeachment and removal by the legislature
The governor can be impeached for "misconduct in office" by the State Assembly and removed by a two-thirds vote of the State Senate.

Recall by the voters
Petitions signed by California state voters equal to 12% of the last vote for the office of governor (with signatures from each of five counties equal to 1% of the last vote for governor in the county) can launch a gubernatorial recall election. The voters can then vote on whether or not to recall the incumbent governor, and on the same ballot can vote for a potential replacement. If a majority of the voters in the election vote to recall the governor, then the person who gains a plurality of the votes in the replacement race will become governor.

Only two governor recall attempts have ever gained enough signatures to make the ballot in California. The 2003 California gubernatorial recall election began with a petition drive that forced Democratic governor Gray Davis into a recall election, which he lost. He was replaced by Republican Arnold Schwarzenegger. It was the first time that a California governor was voted out of office.

In addition to the successful 2003 recall, current governor Gavin Newsom faced a recall election, which he defeated in September 2021.

Relationship with the lieutenant governor 

The lieutenant governor of California is separately elected during the same election, not jointly as the running mate of the gubernatorial candidate. As such, California had a governor and a lieutenant governor of different parties for 28 of the 33 years between 1978 and 2011, whereas previously, this had only occurred in 1875, 1886, 1894 and 1916–1917 due to the resignation or death of an incumbent governor or lieutenant governor.

This occasionally becomes significant, since the California Constitution provides that all the powers of the governor fall to the lieutenant governor whenever the governor is not in the state of California, with the lieutenant governor sometimes signing or vetoing legislation or making political appointments whenever the governor leaves the state.

In practice, there is a gentlemen's agreement for the lieutenant governor not to perform more than perfunctory duties while the governor is away from the state: this agreement was violated when Mike Curb was in office, as he signed several executive orders at odds with the Brown administration when Brown was out of the state. Court rulings have upheld the lieutenant governor's right to perform the duties and assume all of the prerogatives of governor while the governor is out of the state.

The lieutenant governor is also the president of the California State Senate.

Official residence and workplace 

The official residence of the Californian governor is the California Governor's Mansion, in Sacramento. The mansion has served as the residence of 14 governors, while others have declined to reside in the mansion, preferring to arrange for private residential arrangements. It is also one of the official workplaces for the governor.

The governor's primary official workplace is located within the California State Capitol in Sacramento.

The Stanford Mansion, in Sacramento, serves as one of the official workplaces for the governor, as well as the official reception center for the California government.

See also 

 List of governors of California
 List of governors of California before 1850
 List of governors of California by education
 Politics of California
 Politics of California before 1900
 First Ladies and Partners of California
 List of burial places of governors of California

References

External links 

 

1849 establishments in California